Betty Leslie-Melville (née McDonnell; March 7, 1927 – September 23, 2005) was an American born author and conservationist.

Early life
Born in Baltimore, Maryland on March 7, 1927, the daughter of a chiropractor, Leslie-Melville attended Johns Hopkins University.

Family life
Betty married Jock Leslie-Melville in 1964.

She was instrumental in creating sanctuaries to preserve the subspecies of the Rothschild's giraffe in Kenya. Often called the "Giraffe Lady," she spent much of her life living and working in Kenya protecting and caring for the Rothschild's giraffe population there, primarily through a breeding programme established at her residence, Giraffe Manor. During her time working there, the Rothschild's giraffe population grew from about one hundred twenty to over four hundred.

Along with her husband Jock Leslie-Melville and their adopted giraffe Daisy, they were the subject of the film The Last Giraffe (1979) with Susan Anspach playing Betty.

As part of their fund-raising efforts, Betty and Jock Leslie-Melville collaborated on a series of books about animals, most of them characterized by Betty's rather entertaining style. Raising Daisy Rothschild (1977) "the story of two delightful young people and how they raised and grew to love a young giraffe... or two" became a best-seller. Other animal stories and fiction publications include: Elephant Have Right of Way (1973), There's a Rhino in the Rose Bed, Mother (1973), That Nairobi Affair (1975), Bagamoyo: Here I Leave My Heart (1983), A Falling Star: A True Story of Romance (1986), The Giraffe Lady (1997), Daisy Rothschild: The Giraffe That Lives with Me (children's book, 1987), and Walter Warthog (1989), a children's story about the tame warthog they named after their friend Walter Cronkite, the CBS News anchorman. The books helped to raise more funds for the Giraffe Centre that they set up at Lang'ata, Kenya in 1983.  She died on September 23, 2005, in Baltimore.

See also 
Giraffe Centre, Nairobi, Kenya
Giraffe Manor, Nairobi, Kenya

References 

1927 births
2005 deaths
American conservationists
Keepers of animal sanctuaries
People from Baltimore
People from Maryland
Writers about Africa
Johns Hopkins University alumni